Valik Takht (also Romanized as Valīk Takht) is a village in Khvosh Rud Rural District, Bandpey-ye Gharbi District, Babol County, Mazandaran Province, Iran. At the 2006 census, its population was 35, in 9 families.

References 

Populated places in Babol County